Hisarçandır, Konyaaltı is a village in the Konyaaltı district, Antalya Province, Turkey.

References

Konyaaltı District
Villages in Antalya District